The U.S. Air Force Test Pilot School (TPS) graduated the following notable alumni who made significant contributions to the aerospace field. The school's mission is to produce experimental test pilots, flight test engineers, and flight test navigators to lead and conduct test and evaluation of aerospace weapon systems. The school was established on September 9, 1944, as the Flight Test Training Unit at Wright-Patterson Air Force Base (AFB) in Dayton, Ohio. To take advantage of the uncongested skies and superb flying weather, the school was moved on February 4, 1951, to its present location at Edwards Air Force Base in the Mojave Desert of Southern California. Edwards AFB is the home of the Air Force Test Center and has been an integral part of flight testing since June 25, 1951.

Between 1962 and 1972, the Test Pilot School expanded its role to include astronaut training for military test pilots. Thirty-seven TPS graduates of this era were selected for the U.S. space program, and twenty-six went on to earn astronaut's wings by flying in the X-15, Gemini, Apollo, and Space Shuttle programs. Although the school no longer trains astronauts, many TPS graduates since 1972 have been selected by the National Aeronautics and Space Administration (NASA) for duties in space. The school encourages applications from civilians, personnel from other U.S. military services, and individuals from foreign countries. An exchange program allows selected students to attend other test pilot schools including the United States Naval Test Pilot School, the United Kingdom's Empire Test Pilots' School, and France's EPNER.

Famous alumni
The following graduates of the USAF Test Pilot School are listed in the roles for which they are most notable. These roles include:
 Astronaut – Alumni who were trained by a human spaceflight program to command, pilot, or serve as a crew member of a spacecraft.
 Flight test – Alumni notable for their work in flight testing including the "Golden Age" of jet flight testing: 1948 to 1968.
 Military commander – Alumni who achieved notability as the commanding officer of a military unit.
 Author – Alumni who have authored books on flight test.

Key

Astronauts 

 Individual was killed in a work-related (aviation) accident.

Flight test 

 Individual was killed in a work-related (aviation) accident.

Military commanders

Authors

Notes

References

External links 

United States Air Force Test Pilot School alumni
United States Air Force Test Pilot School alumni
Test Pilot School alumni